In mathematics, the Stein–Strömberg theorem or Stein–Strömberg inequality is a result in measure theory concerning the Hardy–Littlewood maximal operator.  The result is foundational in the study of the problem of differentiation of integrals.  The result is named after the mathematicians Elias M. Stein and Jan-Olov Strömberg.

Statement of the theorem
Let λn denote n-dimensional Lebesgue measure on n-dimensional Euclidean space Rn and let M denote the Hardy–Littlewood maximal operator: for a function f : Rn → R, Mf : Rn → R is defined by

where Br(x) denotes the open ball of radius r with center x.  Then, for each p > 1, there is a constant Cp > 0 such that, for all natural numbers n and functions f ∈ Lp(Rn; R),

In general, a maximal operator M is said to be of strong type (p, p) if

for all f ∈ Lp(Rn; R).  Thus, the Stein–Strömberg theorem is the statement that the Hardy–Littlewood maximal operator is of strong type (p, p) uniformly with respect to the dimension n.

References
  
  

Inequalities
Theorems in measure theory
Operator theory